George Williams (30 April 1871 – 27 April 1937) was an Australian rules footballer who played with Collingwood in the Victorian Football League (VFL).

Notes

External links 

		
George Williams's profile at Collingwood Forever

1871 births
1937 deaths
Australian rules footballers from Victoria (Australia)
Collingwood Football Club players